Sadpara Stream or Satpura Cho is a small tributary of the Indus River in Baltistan, Pakistan, which originates from the Satpara Lake and feeds the Skardu City.

References 

Rivers of Gilgit-Baltistan
Tributaries of the Indus River
Rivers of Pakistan